Eamonn or Eamon, Irish spelling Éamonn, Éamon, or Eadhmonn, is a masculine Irish given name. It is an Irish form of the English Edmund, or Edward, which are derived from Old English names containing the elements ēad ("prosperity, riches"), mund ("protector") and ward (guard).

List of people with the given names

 Eamonn Andrews, Irish television personality
 Éamon de Buitléar, Irish documentary film maker
 Eamonn Butler, British economist, director of the Adam Smith Institute
 Eamonn Campbell, Irish musician 
 Eamonn Casey, Irish bishop
 Éamonn Ceannt, Irish nationalist and rebel
 Eamonn Coghlan, Irish runner and senator
 Eamon Collins, Irish Republican Army volunteer
Eamon Colman, Irish artist
 Eamonn Darcy, Irish golfer 
 Eamon (singer), American singer-songwriter
 Eamonn Duggan, Irish politician
 Eamon Dunphy, Irish footballer and television football pundit
 Eamonn Holmes, Northern Irish television personality
 Eamon Keane, Irish actor
 Eamonn Keane (weightlifter), Irish weightlifter
 Eamon Kissane, Irish politician
 Eamonn McCann, Northern Irish journalist and activist
 Eamon McGee, Irish footballer
 Eamonn McGrath, Irish author
 Eamon Ryan, Irish Green Party politician
 Éamonn Ryan, Irish football manager
 Eamon Sullivan, Australian swimmer
 Éamon de Valera, Irish taoiseach and president
 Eamonn Walker, British actor
 Eamon Zayed, Irish-Libyan footballer

Characters in fiction
 Éamon in the RTÉ comedy production Bridget & Éamon
 Eamon Yzalli, an alias used by Corran Horn in the Star Wars expanded universe novels.

See also
Eamonn (disambiguation)

References

English-language masculine given names
Irish-language masculine given names